Redirects to Wiktionary
Shakespearean phrases